Dan Boneh is an Israeli-American professor in applied cryptography and computer security at Stanford University.

In 2016, Boneh was elected a member of the National Academy of Engineering for contributions to the theory and practice of cryptography and computer security.

Biography
Born in Israel in 1969, Boneh obtained his Ph.D. in computer science from Princeton University in 1996 under the supervision of Richard J. Lipton. 

Boneh is one of the principal contributors to the development of pairing-based cryptography, along with Matt Franklin of the University of California, Davis. He joined the faculty of Stanford University in 1997, and became professor of computer science and electrical engineering. He teaches massive open online courses on the online learning platform Coursera. In 1999 he was awarded a fellowship from the David and Lucile Packard Foundation. In 2002, he co-founded a company called Voltage Security with three of his students. The company was acquired by Hewlett-Packard in 2015.

In 2018, Boneh became co-director (with David Mazières) of the newly founded Center for Blockchain Research at Stanford, predicting at the time that "Blockchains will become increasingly critical to doing business globally." Dr. Boneh is also known for putting his entire introductory cryptography course online for free. The course is also available via Coursera.

Awards
 2021 Fellow of the American Mathematical Society
 2020 Selfridge Prize with Jonathan Love.
 2016 Elected to the US National Academy of Engineering
 2016 Fellow of the Association for Computing Machinery
 2014 ACM Prize in Computing (formerly called the ACM-Infosys Foundation award)
 2013 Gödel Prize, with Matthew K. Franklin and Antoine Joux, for his work on the Boneh–Franklin scheme
 2005 RSA Award
 1999 Sloan Research Fellowship
 1999 Packard Award

Publications
Some of Boneh's results in cryptography include:
 2018: Verifiable Delay Functions
 2015: Privacy-preserving proofs of solvency for Bitcoin exchanges
 2010: Efficient Identity-Based Encryption from Learning with Errors Assumption (with Shweta Agrawal and Xavier Boyen)
 2010: He was involved in designing tcpcrypt, TCP extensions for transport-level security
 2005: A partially homomorphic cryptosystem (with Eu-Jin Goh and Kobbi Nissim)
 2005: The first broadcast encryption system with full collision resistance (with Craig Gentry and Brent Waters)
 2003: A timing attack on OpenSSL (with David Brumley)
 2001: An efficient identity-based encryption system (with Matt Franklin) based on the Weil pairing.
 1999: Cryptanalysis of RSA when the private key is less than N0.292 (with Glenn Durfee)
 1997: Fault-based cryptanalysis of public-key systems (with Richard J. Lipton and Richard DeMillo)
 1995: Collision resistant fingerprinting codes for digital data (with James Shaw)
 1995: Cryptanalysis using a DNA computer (with Christopher Dunworth and Richard J. Lipton)

Some of his contributions in computer security include:
 2007: "Show[ing] that the time web sites take to respond to HTTP requests can leak private information."
 2005: PwdHash a browser extension that transparently produces a different password for each site

References

External links
 Dan Boneh's Home Page
 Dan Boneh's Stanford Research Group

Living people
1969 births
Israeli computer scientists
Modern cryptographers
Public-key cryptographers
Computer security academics
Stanford University School of Engineering faculty
Stanford University Department of Electrical Engineering faculty
Israeli cryptographers
Princeton University alumni
Technion – Israel Institute of Technology alumni
Fellows of the American Mathematical Society
Fellows of the Association for Computing Machinery
Gödel Prize laureates
Simons Investigator
Recipients of the ACM Prize in Computing
People associated with cryptocurrency
Israeli atheists
Jewish atheists